The University of Lethbridge Students' Union (ULSU) is a non-profit organization representing interests of undergraduate students studying at the University of Lethbridge.

With approximately 7800 students on the main Lethbridge campus and 500 students in the Calgary campus, the ULSU administers student affairs, including advocacy, committee representation, student services, and events.

Authority
The ULSU is not a university department; it is an independent organization, established in 1967 by the Lieutenant Governor in Council, of Alberta. It reports to the provincial government rather than university administration.

The ULSU receives authority to conduct business through the Post-Secondary Learning Act of Alberta(PSLA). The Act establishes all student associations in Alberta as a corporation, whose members are the students of the public post-secondary institution.

The PSLA allows student associations to administer student affairs, promote general student welfare, create governing documents, acquire property, and maintain the organization through the levy of mandatory fees.

Representation
Federally, the University of Lethbridge Students' Union participates in the Canadian Alliance of Students Associations, and provincially, they are a member of the Council of Alberta University Students. Council members sit on the Social Housing and Action Committee and the Plan-Your-City Advisory Committee through the City of Lethbridge. Councils in the past have held seats on other municipal committees. Council members sit on numerous committees within the University of Lethbridge itself as well.

See also
List of Alberta students' associations
University of Lethbridge
Lethbridge

References

External links

University of Lethbridge website
Calgary Management Students' Society
Post-Secondary Learning Act of Alberta
University of Lethbridge Institutional Analysis

Alberta students' associations
Students' Union
Educational organizations based in Alberta
Organizations established in 1967
1967 establishments in Alberta